The Martin PBM Mariner was an American patrol bomber flying boat of World War II and the early Cold War era. It was designed to complement the Consolidated PBY Catalina and PB2Y Coronado in service. A total of 1,366 PBMs were built, with the first example flying on 18 February 1939 and the type entering service in September 1940, with the last of the type being retired in 1964.

Design and development
In 1937 the Glenn L. Martin Company designed a new twin-engined flying boat, the Model 162, to succeed its earlier Martin P3M and complement the PBY Catalina and PB2Y Coronado. It received an order for a single prototype XPBM-1 on 30 June 1937.  This was followed by an initial production order for 21 PBM-1 aircraft on 28 December 1937.

To test the PBM's layout, Martin built a ⅜ scale flying model, the Martin 162A Tadpole Clipper with a crew of one and powered by a single  Chevrolet engine driving two airscrews via v-belts; this was flown in December 1937. The first genuine PBM, the XPBM-1, flew on 18 February 1939.

The aircraft had multiple gun positions including single mounts at each midship beam and stern above the tail cone.  Additional guns were positioned in the nose and dorsal turrets, each fitted with two-gun turrets. The bomb bays were in the engine nacelles. The gull wing was of cantilever design, and featured clean aerodynamics with an unbraced twin tail. The PBM-1 was equipped with retractable wing landing floats that were hinged outboard, with single-strut supported floats that retracted inwards to rest beneath the wing, with the floats' keels just outboard of each of the engine nacelles. The PBM-3 had fixed floats, and the fuselage was three feet longer than that of the PBM-1.

Operational history

The first PBM-1s entered service with Patrol Squadron Fifty-Five (VP-55) of the United States Navy on 1 September 1940. Prior to the USA's entry into World War II, PBMs were used (together with PBYs) to carry out Neutrality Patrols in the Atlantic, including operations from Iceland. Following Japan's attack on Pearl Harbor, PBMs were used on anti-submarine patrols, sinking their first German U-boat, U-158, on 30 June 1942. PBMs were responsible, wholly or in part, for sinking a total of ten U-boats during World War II. PBMs were also heavily used in the Pacific War, operating from bases at Saipan, Okinawa, Iwo Jima, and the South West Pacific.

The United States Coast Guard acquired 27 Martin PBM-3 aircraft during the first half of 1943. In late 1944, the service acquired 41 PBM-5 models and more were delivered in the latter half of 1945. Ten were still in service in 1955, although all were gone from the active Coast Guard inventory by 1958 (when the last example was released from CGAS San Diego and returned to the U.S. Navy). These flying boats became the backbone of the long-range aerial search and rescue efforts of the Coast Guard in the early post-war years until supplanted by the P5M Marlin and the HU-16 Albatross in the mid-1950s.

PBMs continued in service with the U.S. Navy following the end of World War II, flying long patrol missions during the Korean War. It continued in front line use until replaced by its successor, the P5M Marlin. The last Navy squadron equipped with the PBM, Patrol Squadron Fifty (VP-50), retired them in July 1956.

The British Royal Air Force acquired 32 Mariners, but they were not used operationally, with some returned to the United States Navy. A further 12 PBM-3Rs were transferred to the Royal Australian Air Force for transporting troops and cargo.

The Royal Netherlands Navy acquired 17 PBM-5A Mariners at the end of 1955 for service in Netherlands New Guinea. The PBM-5A was an amphibian with retractable landing gear. The engines were  Pratt & Whitney R-2800-34. After a series of crashes, the Dutch withdrew their remaining aircraft from use in December 1959.

Variants

XPBM-1 (Model 162)
Prototype. Powered by two 1,600 hp (1,194 kW) R-2600-6 engines.
PBM-1 (Model 162)
Initial production version. 5× .50 inch (12.7 mm) machine guns. Two R-2600-6 engines; 21 built.
XPBM-2 (Model 162)
Conversion of one PBM-1 as experimental catapult-launched long-range strategic bomber.
PBM-3 (Model 162B)
Improved version. 1,700 hp (1,270 kW) R-2600-12 engines; 32 built.
PBM-3R (Model 162B)
Unarmed transport version of PBM-3. 18 new build plus 31 converted from PBM-3.
PBM-3C (Model 162C)
Improved patrol version with twin .50 in machine guns in nose and dorsal turrets, and single guns in tail turret and waist positions. AN/APS-15 radar in radome behind cockpit; 274 built.
PBM-3B (Model 162C)
Designation for ex-RAF Mariner GR.1A after return to U.S. Navy.
PBM-3S (Model 162C)
Dedicated anti-submarine aircraft with reduced armament (2× fixed 0.50 in machine guns in nose, single machine gun in port waist position, and single gun in tail turret) and increased range; 94 built as new plus 62 conversions.
PBM-3D (Model 162D)
Patrol bomber with increased power (two 1,900 hp (1,417 kW) R-2600-22s) and increased armament (twin 0.50 in machine guns in nose, dorsal, and tail turrets, plus two waist guns).  259 built.
PBM-4 (Model 162E)
Proposed version with two 2,700 hp (2,015 kW) Wright R-3350 engines; unbuilt.
PBM-5 (Model 162F)
Version with 2,100 hp (1,566 kW) Pratt & Whitney R-2800 engines; 628 built.
PBM-5E
Variant of PBM-5 with improved radar.
PBM-5S
Lightened anti-submarine variant of PBM-5.
PBM-5S2
Improved anti-submarine aircraft with revised radar installation.
PBM-5A (Model 162G)
Amphibian version of PBM-5, with retractable tricycle undercarriage; 36 built plus four conversions.
Mariner I
British designation for 32 PBM-3B supplied to the Royal Air Force.

Operators

Argentine Navy purchased nine PBMs during the 1950s for the Argentine Naval Aviation, retiring its last Mariner in May 1962.

Royal Australian Air Force
No. 40 Squadron RAAF
No. 41 Squadron RAAF

Netherlands Naval Aviation Service
VSQ 321 based at Biak Air Base, Dutch New Guinea operated 15 PBM-5As between 1955 and 1960 after the retirement of their PBYs.

Royal Air Force ordered 33 aircraft but only 28 were delivered.
524 Squadron operated 28 Mariner Is from October–December 1943 under command of No. 15 Group Coastal Command.

 United States Navy
 ATU-1
 ATU-10
 ATU-501
 VPB-2
 VR-8
 VR-10
 VR-21
 VPB-16
 VPB-17
 VPB-20
 VP-21
 VPB-27
 VPB-34
 VP-40
 VP-46
 VP-56
 VPB-98
 VPB-99
VPB-202
 VPB-203
 VP-204
 VP-205
 VPB-206
 VPB-207
 VP-208
 VPB-209
 VPB-210
 VPB-211
 VPB-212
 VPB-213
 VPB-214
 VPB-215
 VPB-216
 VP-731
 VP-892
 VH-1
 VH-2
 VH-3
 VH-4
 VH-5
 VH-6
United States Coast Guard

National Navy of Uruguay purchased three PBM-5S2s in 1956, with the last retired on 3 February 1964.

Surviving aircraft

United States Navy PBM-5A (Bureau Number (BuNo) 122071) is the only surviving Mariner. It is on loan from the National Air and Space Museum in Washington, D.C. and is currently on display at the Pima Air & Space Museum adjacent to Davis–Monthan Air Force Base in Tucson, Arizona. Operated by the USN between 1948 and 1956, it is painted in the markings of Transport Squadron 21 (VR-21) and coded RZ 051 of the early 1950s.
PBM-5 BuNo 59172 lies upside down under Lake Washington. It crashed on 6 May 1949, and after a number of unsuccessful attempts to recover the wreck over the following decades, it is now used as a training site for divers.<ref>"Martin PBM Mariner Patrol Bomber-BuNo 59172."  United States Navy, 29 March 2009. Retrieved: 7 August 2009.</ref>
The Model 162A (registered NX19168), the piloted ⅜ scale test aircraft, is on display at the Baltimore Museum of Industry.

Accidents and incidents

On June 16 1944, a U.S. Navy PBM-5 exploded and crashed in San Francisco Bay, California, killing the pilot, Lieutenant William Hess, and eight other Navy crewmen.
On 30 November 1944, a U.S. Navy PBM-5 crashed into Mount Tamalpais in northern California, killing eight naval aviators and naval aircrewmen. The aircraft had taken off from Naval Air Station Alameda and was part of a larger flight headed for Hawaii when it developed engine trouble shortly after takeoff.
On 5 December 1945, United States Navy PBM-5 (BuNo 59225), based at Naval Air Station Banana River, Florida was believed to have been destroyed in a mid-air explosion off the coast of Florida near The Bahamas, while searching for the missing TBM Avengers of Flight 19 from Naval Air Station Fort Lauderdale, Florida.
On 30 December 1946, a U.S. Navy PBM-5 crashed on Thurston Island, Antarctica, while supporting Operation Highjump.
On 10 September 1958, Mariner P-303 was being ferried to the Netherlands from Biak, Indonesia. Due to technical problems, a forced landing was carried out at Abadan, Iran. About two weeks later, repairs had been accomplished, and the aircraft took off. Shortly after takeoff, an oil leak was observed on engine number one. While on final approach for landing at Abadan airport, the aircraft suddenly lost height and crashed, killing all aboard. It appeared that the remaining propeller reversed thrust, causing the crew to lose control.
On 9 November 1958, a PBM-5 Mariner (CS-THB, named "Porto Santo") of the Portuguese airline ARTOP (Aero-Topográfica) piloted by Harry Frank Broadbent and co-piloted by Thomas Rowell, carrying four other crew and 30 passengers, disappeared on a scheduled passenger flight from Cabo Ruivo, Lisbon, Portugal to Funchal, Madeira. The last communication from the aircraft (when it was about 13°W) was a radio message code "QUG", meaning "I am forced to land immediately". No trace has ever been found of the aircraft, nor its six crew or 30 passengers.1958 / NOV / 09 - Accident with the Seaplane - CS-THB - disappeared between Lisbon and Funchal GIAA Final Report (in Portuguese) 

Specifications (PBM-1)

See also
 Flight 19

References

Notes

Bibliography

Bridgeman, Leonard. “The Martin Model 162 Mariner.” Jane's Fighting Aircraft of World War II. London: Studio, 1946. .
Donald, David, ed. American Warplanes of World War II. London: Aerospace Publishing, 1995. .
Dorr, Robert F. "Variant Briefing: Martin Flying Boats: Mariner, Mars and Marlin". Wings of Fame, Volume 7, 1997, pp. 114–133. London: Aerospace Publishing,  .
Green, William. War Planes of the Second World War: Volume Five Flying Boats. London: Macdonald, 1968. .
Hoffman, Richard A. "Dutch Mariners: PBMs in Service with the Netherlands Navy". Air Enthusiast, No. 97, January/February 2002, pp. 73–77. Stamford, UK:Key Publishing.  ISSN 0143-5450.
Hoffman, Richard A. The Fighting Flying Boat: A History of the Martin PBM Mariner. Annapolis, Maryland: US Naval Institute Press, 2004. .
Hoffman, Richard A. "South American Mariners: Martin PBMs in Argentina and Uruguay". Air Enthusiast, No. 104, March/April 2003, pp. 29–33. Stamford, UK: Key Publishing. ISSN 0143-5450.
Jefford, C. G. RAF Squadrons. Ramsbury, UK: Airlife Publishing, UK, First edition, 1988. .
March, Daniel J. British Warplanes of World War II. London: Aerospace Publishing, 1998. .Martin PBM-3C US Navy Pilot's Handbook (MTPBM3C-POH-C). Washington, D.C.: The Bureau of Aeronautics, Navy Department, 1944.Martin PBM-3D 1943 Pilot's Handbook of Flight Operating Instructions (AN 01-35QF-1). Washington, D.C.: The Bureau of Aeronautics, Navy Department, 1944.Martin PBM-3D 1945 Pilot's Handbook of Flight Operating Instructions (AN 01-35EE-1). Washington, DC: The Bureau of Aeronautics, Navy Department, 1944.Martin PBM-5 1947 Navy Model Pilot's Handbook (AN 01-35ED-1). Washington, D.C.: The Bureau of Aeronautics, Navy Department, 1944.PBM-3S PNM-3D Handbook of Structural Repair Navy Model (A.N. 01-35QG-3). Washington, D.C.: The Bureau of Aeronautics, Navy Department, 1944.
Roberts, Michael D. Dictionary of American Naval Aviation Squadrons: Volume 2: The History of VP, VPB, VP(HL) and VP(AM) Squadrons. Washington, D.C.: Naval Historical Center, 2000.
Smith, Bob. PBM Mariner in action - Aircraft No. 74. Carrollton, Texas: Squadron/Signal Publications, 1986. .
Swanborough, Gordon and Peter M. Bowers. United States Navy Aircraft since 1911. London: Putnam, 1976. .
Sweet, Donald H. et al. The Forgotten Heroes: The Story of Rescue Squadron VH-3 in World War II.Ho-Ho-Kus, New Jersey:DoGO, 2000. .

Further reading

External links

US Warplanes
Maryland Aviation Museum
The Martin Mariner, Mars, & Marlin Flying Boats at Greg Goebel's site
PBM history with U.S. Navy
U.S. Navy patrol aircraft
RAAF PBMs 
RAF Mariner GR I Air Classics article
PBM launch & in flight (color film footage)
Decommissioned PBM sunk in Kwajalien Lagoon

PBM Mariner
1930s United States patrol aircraft
Flying boats
Gull-wing aircraft
High-wing aircraft
World War II patrol aircraft of the United States
Aircraft first flown in 1939
Twin piston-engined tractor aircraft